The Principality of Erfurt was a small state in modern Thuringia, Germany, that existed from 1807 to 1814, comprising the modern city of Erfurt and the surrounding land. It was subordinate directly to Napoleon, the Emperor of the French, rather than being a part of the Confederation of the Rhine. After nearly 3 months of siege, the city fell to Prussian, Austrian and Russian forces. Having mainly been Prussian territory before the Napoleonic Wars, most of the lands were restored to Prussia by the Congress of Vienna.

Background and establishment 
In the wake of the French Revolutionary Wars and the Treaty of Lunéville, the Holy Roman Empire underwent a process of substantial territorial reorganisation known as the German mediatization, under which Erfurt, since the 10th century a subject of the Electorate and Archbishopric of Mainz, was transferred to the Kingdom of Prussia, to compensate for territories Prussia lost to France on the Left Bank of the Rhine.

Fearing the rise in the power of Napoleon's First French Empire after their defeat of Austria and establishment of the French-sponsored Confederation of the Rhine, Prussia and Russia mobilized for a fresh campaign, and Prussian troops massed in Saxony as a part of the War of the Fourth Coalition. The decisive defeat suffered by the Prussian Army subjugated Prussia to the French Empire until the Sixth Coalition was formed in 1813.

After Jena and Auerstedt, a large number of refugees appeared at the Prussian fortress of Erfurt. At first they were refused entrance, but later the gates were opened and soon the city thronged with at least 12,000 demoralized soldiers. Attempts were made by some officers to return the troops to their regiments, but the men refused to cooperate. Joachim Murat, Marshal of France, sent French Colonel  into Erfurt under a flag of truce. The Frenchman demanded an immediate surrender, which the Prussian commandant initially refused. Karl August, Duke of Saxe-Weimar and Saxe-Eisenach, waited near Erfurt in the hope that large numbers of troops would join the retreat; when few did so, he withdrew toward Langensalza. Without support from Prussian , collapsed from injuries suffered at Auerstedt, the fortress commandant signed articles of capitulation; included in the terms were the surrender of the Petersberg Citadel and large quantities of gunpowder and munitions. Altogether, about 12,000 Prussian and Saxon troops under William VI, Prince of Orange-Nassau, became prisoners and 65 artillery pieces were captured. At the time of the capitulation, Murat had about 16,000 troops near Erfurt. Historian Francis Loraine Petre remarked that Erfurt was the first of a series of "pusillanimous capitulations" by Prussian fortress commanders, writing that Napoleon's plans might have been delayed had the city held out for just a few days. Instead, the French emperor was able to immediately launch the entire army after his fleeing enemies.

French rule 

Napoleon first visited the principality on 23 July 1807, inspecting the citadels and fortifications.

On 4 August 1807, Napoleon attached the Saxe-Weimar territory of Blankenhain and declared the Principality of Erfurt to be directly subordinate to himself as an "imperial state domain", separate from the Confederation of the Rhine (which was nominally a French protectorate set up to replace the now-defunct Holy Roman Empire), which the surrounding Thuringian states had joined.

On 27 September 1808, Napoleon was ceremonially presented the keys to the city at the Brühler-Tor before going to meet Tsar Alexander I on the road to Weimar to re-enter the city with the tsar. Between 27 September and 14 October 1808, Napoleon hosted the Congress of Erfurt in the principality, intended to reaffirm the alliance with the Tsar, which had been concluded the previous year with the Treaties of Tilsit at the end of the War of the Fourth Coalition. The meeting became a great conference involving an array of kings, princes, dukes, barons and notables from all over Europe, including the kings of Saxony, Bavaria, Württemberg and Westphalia (the last being Napoleon's brother Jérôme). The resulting convention recognised the Russian conquests of Finland from Sweden and the Danubian Principalities from the Ottoman Empire and stated that, should France go to war again with Austria, Russia should make common cause, though the tsar's support in the War of the Fifth Coalition was minimal.

During their administration, the French introduced street lighting and a tax on foreign horses to pay for maintaining the road surface. The  suffered under the French occupation, with its inventory being auctioned off to other local churches — including the organ, bells and even the tower of the  chapel — and the former monastery's library being donated to the University of Erfurt (and then to the Boineburg Library when the university closed in 1816). Similarly the Cyriaksburg Citadel was damaged by the French with the city-side walls being partially dismantled in the hunt for imagined treasures from the convent, with workers being paid from the sale of the building materials.

In 1811, to commemorate the birth of the Prince Imperial (later Napoleon II), a  ceremonial column of wood and plaster was erected on the common, on the instigation of the French administration and funded by the city treasury. Inaugurated on 20 March 1811; it was burned and destroyed by the citizenry on 6 January 1814 when the Sixth Coalition finally entered the city after over 2 months of siege.

Siege and fall 

With the Sixth Coalition forming after French defeat in Russia, on 24 February 1813 Napoleon ordered the Petersburg Citadel to prepare for siege, visiting the city on 25 April to inspect the fortifications, in particular both Citadels.

On 10 July 1813, Napoleon put in charge of the defences of Erfurt brigadier general , baron of the Empire.

With the Sixth Coalition's decisive victory at Leipzig (16–19 October 1813), French troops head to Erfurt; Napoleon visited on 23 October, Erfurt being his only major weapons and storage depot east of the Rhine. Within a week of Leipzig, however, Erfurt was besieged by Prussian, Austrian and Russian troops under the command of Prussian Lt Gen von Kleist.

After a capitulation signed by d'Alton on 20 December 1813 the French troops withdrew to the two fortresses of Petersberg and Cyriaksburg, allowing for the Coalition forces to march into Erfurt on 6 January 1814 through the  Gate, to jubilant greetings; the  ceremonial column was burned and destroyed as a symbol of the citizens' oppression under the French. After a call for volunteers 3 days later, 300 Erfurters joined the Coalition armies in France.

Finally, in May 1814, the French capitulated, with 1,700 French troops vacating the Petersberg and Cyriaksburg fortresses. During the two and a half months of siege, the mortality rate rose in the city greatly; 1,564 Erfurt citizens died in 1813, around a thousand more than the previous year.

After the Congress of Vienna, Erfurt was restored to Prussia on 21 June 1815, becoming the capital of one of the three districts of the new Province of Saxony, but some southern and eastern parts of Erfurter lands joined Blankenhain in being transferred to the Grand Duchy of Saxe-Weimar-Eisenach the following September. Although enclosed by Thuringian territory in the west, south and east, the city remained part of the Prussian Province of Saxony until 1944.

References

Further reading 
 
 
 
 
 

Principality Of Erfurt
Former states and territories of Thuringia
Client states of the Napoleonic Wars
1806 establishments in Europe
1814 disestablishments in Europe